Edward Rice may refer to:

Ed Rice (1918–2001), American author, publisher, photojournalist and painter
Edward A. Rice Jr. (born 1955), United States Air Force officer
Edward E. Rice (1847–1924), writer in American theater
Edward Loranus Rice (1871–1960), American biologist
Edward M. Rice (born 1960), American Catholic bishop
Edward Royd Rice (1790–1878), British MP for Dover, 1837–1857
Edward Y. Rice (1820–1883), U.S. representative from Illinois
Edward Rice (Royal Navy officer) (1819–1902), British admiral
Edward Rice (priest) (1779–1862), Dean of Gloucester
Edward Hyde Rice (1847–1895), American academic
Edward Le Roy Rice (1871–1938), American producer of minstrel shows

See also
Edmund Rice (disambiguation)